Vetulonia paucivaricosa is a species of sea snail, a marine gastropod mollusk in the superfamily Seguenzioidea.

Description
The shell grows to a height of 3.8 mm.

(Described as Trochus cancellatus) The rather thin shell forms a depressed cone, opaque, and lustreless. The sculpture consists of oblique laminar ribs in the line of growth, which are crossed by as many but slighter spiral striae. There are about 20 ribs and striae on the body whorl. This sculpture covers
the base, but the striae are wanting on the apex. The colour of the shell is pale yellowish-brown. The spire is rather depressed. The shell contains 5-6 convex whorls. The body whorl  occupies three fifths of the shell. The apex is regular and compressed. The aperture is more round than oval, angulated above and below on the inner side. The outer lip is somewhat expanded and thickened. The umbilicus is rather narrow, with a deep perforation which exposes the inner whorls.

Distribution
This species occurs in the Atlantic Ocean in the bathyal zone of the Azores and off Portugal, found at depths between 250 m and 805 m.

References

External links
 Dautzenberg, P. (1889). Contribution à la faune malacologique des Iles Açores. Resultats des dragages effectués par le yacht l'Hirondelle pendant sa campagne scientifique de 1887. Révision des mollusques marins des Açores. Résultats des Campagnes Scientifiques Accomplies sur son Yacht par Albert Ier Prince Souverain de Monaco, I. Imprimerie de Monaco. 112 pp.; IV plates.
 Dall, W. H. 1913. A new genus of Trochidae. Nautilus 27: 86-87
 Dall, W. H. 1927. Small shells from dredgings off the southeast coast of the United States by the United States Fisheries Steamer 'Albatross' in 1885 and 1886. Proceedings of the United States National Museum 70(2667): 1-134
  Serge GOFAS, Ángel A. LUQUE, Joan Daniel OLIVER,José TEMPLADO & Alberto SERRA (2021) - The Mollusca of Galicia Bank (NE Atlantic Ocean); European Journal of Taxonomy 785: 1–114
 Gofas, S.; Le Renard, J.; Bouchet, P. (2001). Mollusca, in: Costello, M.J. et al. (Ed.) (2001). European register of marine species: a check-list of the marine species in Europe and a bibliography of guides to their identification. Collection Patrimoines Naturels, 50: pp. 180–213

paucivaricosa
Gastropods described in 1889